Spring Hill Farm is a historic farm at 263 Meriden Road in Lebanon, New Hampshire.  Founded in the late 18th century, the farm is noted for innovations in dairy farming practices introduced in the 1920s by Maurice Downs.  It is also one of a small number of surviving farm properties in the town, and was listed on the National Register of Historic Places in 2002.

Description and history
Spring Hill Farm is located in a rural setting in southeastern Lebanon, on  bounded at its southern and western sides by Meriden Road and Laplante Road.  The farm complex is located near the road junction, containing a main house, barn, and other smaller outbuildings. The main house is a -story brick structure built c. 1799, and a barn constructed c. 1929 but incorporating an early 19th-century structure, as well as lumber salvaged from other period barns.  Only the lands immediately north and east of the complex are open fields; the balance of the property is wooded.

When Maurice Downes, a native of Wilmot, New Hampshire, purchased this property in 1913, it included the house and three 19th-century English barns.  Downes was educated in agricultural practices at the University of New Hampshire, and introduced the high-producing Holstein cow to the area for dairy production; it is now the dominant milk-producing breed in the region.  In the 1920s he adapted one of the barns to house all of the dairying operations under one roof, enlarging it by using materials recycled by disassembling the other two barns.  His structure included a concrete floor, and a trolley-based mechanism for removing manure to an exterior manure shed, all innovative developments in the area.

See also
National Register of Historic Places listings in Grafton County, New Hampshire

References

Houses on the National Register of Historic Places in New Hampshire
Federal architecture in New Hampshire
Houses completed in 1799
Houses in Grafton County, New Hampshire
Farms on the National Register of Historic Places in New Hampshire
National Register of Historic Places in Grafton County, New Hampshire
Lebanon, New Hampshire